The Sparagmite Formation is a geologic formation in Norway. It preserves fossils dating back to the Cambrian period.

Fossil content 
The formation has provided several fossils:
 Acrothele bellapunctata
 Ellipsocephalus nordenskjoldi
 Helcionella subrugosa
 Holmia grandis, H. kjerulfi
 Kjerulfia lata
 Marocella antiqua, M. depressa
 Obolella rotundata, Obolella (Glyptias) favosa
 Runcinodiscus cf. index
 Strenuella linnarssoni, S. primaeva
 Torellella laevigata
 Volborthella tenuis
 Hyolithes sp.
 ?Lingulella sp.

See also 
 List of fossiliferous stratigraphic units in Norway

References 

Geologic formations of Norway
Cambrian Series 2
Cambrian Norway
Cambrian southern paleotemperate deposits
Sandstone formations
Shale formations
Paleontology in Norway